"I Predict a Riot" is a song by English indie rock band Kaiser Chiefs, appearing on their debut album, Employment (2005). It was originally released as their second single on 1 November 2004 and was the band's first release on the B-Unique label. It entered at number 22 on the UK Singles Chart. When re-released in 2005 as a double A-side with "Sink that Ship", it peaked at number nine on the UK chart. It was used in the 2005 racing video game Gran Turismo 4 as a song that would play during races and race replays, and was also used in Guitar Hero 3.

Inspiration
Drummer Nick Hodgson used to DJ at a club in Leeds called the Cockpit. He would often drive home past another nightclub called Majestyk's which often had people and police fighting each other, and sometimes drunk clubgoers would even bang on the windows of his car at 3am. He took inspiration from this one night and wrote a riff on the piano when he got home. The "friend of a friend who got beaten" was a friend of a fellow DJ at the Cockpit. The title came from an event Hodgson DJed at a different club called Pigs, where a band called Black Wire was playing. The crowd was so chaotic that he said to the club's boss, "I predict a riot".

Background
Portraying a rowdy night out in their native Leeds with members from the former band Black Wire, "I Predict a Riot" is one of the group's signature songs. It is one of the three tracks the band played when they opened Live 8 in Philadelphia, alongside "Everyday I Love You Less and Less" and "Oh My God".

The song makes a reference to John Smeaton ("an old Leodensian"), a Civil Engineer, born in Austhorpe, Leeds.  Singer Ricky Wilson's  school house was named after him. The song thrives on its Yorkshire heritage with the use of pronouns such as "thee", a nod to the band's origins, for "thee" and "thou" survived in Yorkshire dialect and are still used to an extent today. Both "I Predict a Riot" and "Sink that Ship" were featured on the soundtrack to the video game Gran Turismo 4. "I Predict a Riot" appeared in Guitar Hero 3: Legends of Rock as downloadable content alongside present from the start, "Ruby". It has also been confirmed for release for Rock Band. Currently the song is played at Elland Road immediately before the band's hometown club Leeds United F.C. walk onto the pitch. "Take My Temperature", a B-side on the initial release, is a live favourite, notably at earlier gigs. Also, the guitar riff after "who doesn't want to be out there" is overdubbed with Hammond organ, played by Peanut. In live performances, the song begins with a drum solo played by Nick and Ricky around the same kit.

It featured in a scene of Las Vegas second season, episode 16 titled "Can You See What I See?". The song and the band are also referenced in Plan B's 2012 song "Ill Manors", specifically in the lyrics "London's burning, I predict a riot / Fall in, fall out who knows what it's all about / What did that chief say? / Something 'bout the kaisers"

The song's lyrics were criticised by Owen Jones for expressing "pure class bile" and reproducing "the caricature of the undignified, 'slapper' chav girl".

Music videos
There have been two videos produced for "I Predict a Riot". The first, made for the original release, was directed by Charlie Paul, and features the band performing in front of a crowded audience, who appear to start a "pillow fight". The video contains Ricky Wilson wearing a Nevile house tie from the Leeds Grammar School.

The second video, directed by Swedish collective StyleWar, gained more airplay. The main plot is the band wandering and performing in an Edwardian town, catching the attention of a mysterious freak show owner.  The climax of the features the band performing on the stage of a crowded replica of The Globe Theatre.

Track listings

 UK 7-inch single (2004) 
A. "I Predict a Riot"
B. "Take My Temperature"

 UK CD single (2004) 
 "I Predict a Riot"
 "Wrecking Ball"

 Australian CD single (2005) 
 "I Predict a Riot" – 3:54
 "Wrecking Ball" – 3:50
 "Take My Temperature" – 2:35
 "I Predict a Riot" (video)

 UK CD1 and 7-inch single (2005) 
 "I Predict a Riot" – 3:54
 "Sink That Ship" – 2:38

 UK CD2 (2005) 
 "I Predict a Riot" – 3:54
 "Less Is More" – 2:52
 "Everyday I Love You Less and Less" (Boys Noize Remix) – 5:26
 "I Predict a Riot" (new version—video)

Charts

Weekly charts

Year-end charts

Certifications

Release history

In popular culture
The song was heard playing in the background as Liz Truss gave her farewell speech on October 25, 2022. The incident was orchestrated by activist Steve Bray.

References

2004 singles
2004 songs
2005 singles
B-Unique Records singles
British power pop songs
Kaiser Chiefs songs
Polydor Records singles
Song recordings produced by Stephen Street
Songs written by Andrew White (musician)
Songs written by Nick "Peanut" Baines
Songs written by Nick Hodgson
Songs written by Ricky Wilson (British musician)
Songs written by Simon Rix